Snelling & Highland is a bus rapid transit station on the Metro A Line in Saint Paul, Minnesota.

The station is located at the intersection of Highland Parkway on Snelling Avenue. Both station platforms are located north of Highland Parkway.

The station opened June 11, 2016 with the rest of the A Line.

Bus connections
This station does not have any bus connections. Route 84 providing local service on Snelling Avenue shares platforms with the A Line.

Notable places nearby
Highland National Golf Course
Highland Park, Saint Paul

References

External links 
 Metro Transit: Snelling & Highland Station

Bus stations in Minnesota